Somewhere in Turkey is a 1918 American short comedy film featuring Harold Lloyd.

Plot
A girl (Bebe Daniels) survives a shipwreck.  Upon reaching shore, she is apprehended by several soldiers of a sultan who forcibly bring her to him.  The girl immediately rejects the sultan's advances and is promptly thrown into a basement jail cell.  A professor (Harold Lloyd) and his assistant (Snub Pollard) are travelling by camel through the desert.  The out-of-control beast brings them to the sultan's residence.  They find a rock bearing an Arabic inscription.  Curious, they venture inside to find out what the words mean.  They inadvertently interrupt the sultan watching a dancing girl.  The angry sultan tells the visitors that the rock bears a warning that if any white man enters the building, he will not leave it alive.  The two men try to flee, but Harold is eventually caught.  He is erroneously put in the same jail cell as the girl.  When the sultan sees this mistake, he angrily breaks into the cell to punish both of them.  Harold uses the opportunity to escape with the girl and head for Brooklyn on his camel.

Cast
 Harold Lloyd as A Fearless Explorer
 Snub Pollard as His Assistant
 Bebe Daniels as A Girl in Danger
 William Blaisdell
 Sammy Brooks
 Harry Burns
 Louise Carver
 Lige Conley (credited as Lige Cromley)
 Billy Fay
 William Gillespie
 Helen Gilmore
 Lew Harvey
 Wallace Howe
 Dee Lampton
 Gus Leonard
 James Parrott
 Charles Stevenson (credited as Charles E. Stevenson)
 Dorothea Wolbert

Reception
Like many American films of the time, Somewhere in Turkey was subject to restrictions and cuts by city and state film censorship boards. For example, the Chicago Board of Censors cut three scenes of sticking spear into man's posterior, scene of spear in woman's posterior, and spear in old man's posterior.

See also
 Harold Lloyd filmography

References

External links

1918 films
1918 comedy films
1918 short films
American silent short films
American black-and-white films
Films directed by Alfred J. Goulding
Silent American comedy films
American comedy short films
1910s American films